The McLean House is a historic house at 470 Ridgeway in Little Rock, Arkansas.  It is a -story Colonial Revival wood-frame structure, five bays wide, with a side gable roof and weatherboard siding.  The main entrance is distinguished by its surround, with Tuscan columns supporting an oversized segmented-arch pediment.  Enclosed porches with paneled and pilastered corners extend to either side of the main block.  The house designed by the architectural firm of Thompson and Harding and built around 1920.

The house was listed on the National Register of Historic Places in 1982.

See also
National Register of Historic Places listings in Little Rock, Arkansas

References

Houses on the National Register of Historic Places in Arkansas
Colonial Revival architecture in Arkansas
Houses completed in 1920
Houses in Little Rock, Arkansas
National Register of Historic Places in Little Rock, Arkansas
Historic district contributing properties in Arkansas